Cecil Middleton (26 May 1911 – 3 September 1984) was an English first-class cricketer.

Middleton was born in Leeds in May 1911, the son of Henry Dubs Middleton and Jane Dorothy Elizabeth Middleton (née Berney), daughter of Sir Henry Hanson Berney, 9th Baronet. He was educated at Charterhouse School, before going up to University College, Oxford. While studying at Oxford, he played first-class cricket for Oxford University in 1933, making four appearances. He scored 128 runs in his four matches, at an average of 21.33 and a high score of 44. With his right-arm medium pace bowling, he took four wickets with best figures of 3 for 60.

Middleton was an Oxford Blue and champion golfer, winning the St Andrews Foursomes Cup at The Royal and Ancient Golf Club of St Andrews in the early 1930s. Middleton died in Scotland in September 1984 at Southend, Argyll. Other members of Middleton's family who were "well known" sportsmen include his cousin, Robert Carrington Middleton (1875–1916) who was reportedly also born in Leeds  and boarded at Marlborough College where he learned the game of hockey, later representing the county of Yorkshire in that sport.

References

External links

1911 births
1984 deaths
Cricketers from Leeds
English cricketers of 1919 to 1945
People educated at Charterhouse School
Alumni of University College, Oxford
English cricketers
Oxford University cricketers
Middleton family (British)